Lake Hope or Hope Lake can refer to:

 Lake Hope (Antarctica)
 Lake Hope (Colorado)
 Lake Hope (New Zealand)
 Lake Hope (South Australia)
 Lake Hope State Park, Ohio

 Hope Lake (Meeker County, Minnesota)